Give is an EP and single by American rock band Cold. The track dates back to 1992, with it first being recorded by the band for their Into Everything EP.

Music video 
A video was produced for the title track, which features Jonathan Davis of Korn and Fred Durst of Limp Bizkit dressed in suits chasing a mysterious creature through a building.

Track listing

Personnel
Scooter Ward – vocals, rhythm guitar, piano, keyboards
Kelly Hayes – lead guitar
Jeremy Marshall – bass
Sam McCandless – drums

All songs
Written by Scooter Ward
Mixed by Terry Date
Production and recording by Ross Robinson
Executive producer: Jordan Schur
Engineered by Richard Kaplan
"Blame" additional vocals: Fred Durst

References

1998 EPs
Cold (band) EPs